Patrick Wintour (born 1 November 1954) is a British journalist and the diplomatic editor of The Guardian. He was the political editor of The Guardian from 2006 to 2015 and was formerly the newspaper's chief political correspondent for two periods, from 1988 to 1996, and 2000 to 2006. In the intervening period he was the political editor of The Observer.

Early life
Wintour was born on 1 November 1954, the son of former Evening Standard editor Charles Vere Wintour by his marriage to  Eleanor "Nonie" Trego Baker (1917–1995), an American, the daughter of a Harvard law professor. His parents married in 1940 and divorced in 1979. His elder sister, Dame Anna Wintour, is the current Editor-in-Chief of the American edition of Vogue magazine. His brother Jim arranged equestrian events at the 2012 Summer Olympics. Wintour is the grandson of Major-General Fitzgerald Wintour.

Wintour was educated at The Hall School in Hampstead, Westminster School and Corpus Christi College, Oxford. At Westminster, he was a contemporary of Adam Mars-Jones and Chris Huhne.

Career
Known for his contacts inside the Labour Party, Wintour began his career in journalism on the New Statesman from 1976 to 1982, before joining The Guardian as chief Labour Correspondent in 1983. From 1988, he was the paper's Chief Political Correspondent, 1988–1996, and then Political Editor of The Observer, The Guardians Sunday sister paper, until 2000. He returned to The Guardian as Chief Political Correspondent in 2000 before being appointed political editor in 2006, on the retirement of Michael White. Wintour won the British Press Awards "Political Journalist of the Year" award in 2007.

In October 2015, Wintour moved to a new role as The Guardians Diplomatic Editor. In December Anushka Asthana and Heather Stewart were appointed to succeed him in a job-share arrangement. All three took up their new roles at the beginning of 2016.

Personal life
Wintour's second wife is Rachel Sylvester, a journalist for The Times. The couple have two children. 

Wintour was formerly married to the journalist Madeleine Bunting, with whom he also has two children.

References

External links
My job: Patrick Wintour, political editor, The Guardian, Press Gazette, 28 May 2007

1954 births
Alumni of Corpus Christi College, Oxford
British male journalists
Living people
Place of birth missing (living people)
People educated at Westminster School, London
The Guardian journalists
British people of American descent
Patrick